The 2021 Abu Dhabi Grand Prix (officially known as the Formula 1 Etihad Airways Abu Dhabi Grand Prix 2021) was a Formula One motor race held on 12 December 2021 at the Yas Marina Circuit in Abu Dhabi, United Arab Emirates. Contested over a distance of 58 laps, the race was the twenty-second and final round of the 2021 Formula One World Championship. The race decided both the Drivers' and Constructors' championships; Max Verstappen and Lewis Hamilton both had 369.5 points coming into the race. Hamilton led most of the race and appeared on course to win what would have been a record eighth World Drivers' Championship having taken the lead at the start of the race at turn 1 on the first lap, Verstappen won the race on the final lap with an overtake for the lead on title rival Hamilton, after a controversial safety car restart in the last moments of the race. The FIA thus conducted an inquiry into the race which led to a restructuring of race control including the replacement of Michael Masi as race director and amendments to the safety car rules. That inquiry subsequently concluded that the race officials had misapplied the then-regulations due to human error, but confirmed the results.

Verstappen's win secured his first Formula One World Drivers' Championship of his career by eight points from Hamilton, and Red Bull Racing's first since . Mercedes won their eighth consecutive Formula One World Constructors' Championship, setting a new record. The Grand Prix was also the final race for  World Champion Kimi Räikkönen; the 42-year-old Finn retired from Formula One after a two-decade career spanning 349 Grands Prix starts.

Background 

The race was originally scheduled to take place on 5 December, but it was rescheduled after the postponement of the Australian Grand Prix due to the COVID-19 pandemic. Its original date was filled with the Saudi Arabian Grand Prix and the Australian race was eventually cancelled and replaced by the Qatar Grand Prix.

Circuit redevelopment 
Yas Marina underwent redevelopment that shortened the track and the expected lap time in order to increase top speeds and overtaking opportunities. The chicane after turn 4 was removed, and the turn 5 hairpin (which was turn 7 before redevelopment) was widened. The four corner sequence of turns which was turns 11–14 became one banked turn 9. The radius of turns 12–15 (previously 17–20) were increased to allow cars to carry more speed, with the changes to turn 15 allowing cars to be able to travel flat out through the corner.

Entrants 

The drivers and teams were the same as the season entry list with no additional stand-in drivers for the race. Jack Aitken drove for Williams in the first practice session, in place of George Russell. Nikita Mazepin tested positive for coronavirus after qualifying, forcing his withdrawal from the race, he was not replaced.

The Grand Prix marked the last Formula One race for the  World Champion Kimi Räikkönen, who had announced his intention of retiring at the end of the championship, ending his Formula One career after 19 seasons and moved to NASCAR Cup Series. , it also marked the last race for Antonio Giovinazzi, who moved to Formula E, and Nikita Mazepin, whose contract was terminated following the 2022 Russian invasion of Ukraine and the cancellation of Uralkali's title sponsorship. It was also the final races for George Russell and Valtteri Bottas at Williams and Mercedes, respectively, as they moved to Mercedes and Alfa Romeo Racing.

Bottas raced with a special helmet for the occasion, featuring photos of all the moments he spent at Mercedes, and he sported a special set of blue racing overalls. Alpine featured the words "El Plan" in both their cars referencing a popular Internet meme. This race also marked the last race for Honda, as the Japanese company ceased their engine supply to the Red Bull Racing and AlphaTauri teams, though they are set to provide assistance to Red Bull Powertrains, who take over the engine supply for the  season.

Championship standings before the race and title permutations 
Title rivals Max Verstappen (Red Bull Racing) and Lewis Hamilton (Mercedes) both entered the round with 369.5 points, leaving the championship contenders level on points for the final round for the first time since  and for the second time in the sport's history. The Drivers' Championship was decided in the final round for the 30th time, and the first time since . The driver who scored the most points would win the championship; if the drivers had scored an equal amount of points, Verstappen would have won the championship due to having won more races (nine to Hamilton's eight) prior to this race. In the Constructors' Championship, Mercedes led with 587.5 points, 28 ahead of Red Bull on 559.5, with 44 still available; this was the first time since  that the final round of the season decided the Constructors' Championship. In the midfield, Ferrari led McLaren in the battle for third place in the constructors by a margin of 38.5 points.

Acrimonious on-track battles throughout the season led to concerns that one of the drivers might cause a deliberate in-race collision in an attempt to win the championship: the  championship battle between McLaren teammates Ayrton Senna and Alain Prost was decided by such an incident at the Japanese Grand Prix; the  championship rematch, with Prost now at Ferrari, ended in Senna's favour with another collision at the Suzuka race; Michael Schumacher's collision with Damon Hill at the 1994 Australian Grand Prix took the Briton out of title contention in the  season; and an unsuccessful collision caused by Schumacher against Jacques Villeneuve at the 1997 European Grand Prix led to the German driver's disqualification from the  season. In response to the concerns, race director Michael Masi warned that Verstappen or Hamilton could be subject to further sanctions from the FIA if one of them decided to manufacture a deliberate race-ending collision in an attempt to engineer a favourable championship result, up to and including championship disqualification or future race bans.

Tyres choices 
Sole tyre supplier Pirelli provided the C3, C4, and C5 tyre compounds—the softest selections available—for use in dry conditions.

Practice 
Three practice sessions were scheduled over the course of the weekend. The first session took place at 13:30 local time (UTC+04:00) on Friday 10 December. The second session took place at 17:00. The third session took place at 14:00 on Saturday 11 December. The first practice session passed without incident and ended with Max Verstappen setting the fastest time, followed by Valtteri Bottas and Lewis Hamilton. The second practice session ended with Hamilton fastest by 0.3 seconds to second-placed Esteban Ocon, while Bottas was third fastest ahead of Verstappen, 0.6 seconds behind Hamilton. Kimi Räikkönen crashed at turn 14 just as the session was concluding, but was unhurt.

Qualifying 
Qualifying started at 17:00 local time on Saturday 11 December. The first qualifying session was briefly suspended after a Haas driver collided with a bollard but was resumed without further incident, with the Mercedes drivers of Lewis Hamilton and Valtteri Bottas recording the fastest times of the session. In the second qualifying session, initial flying laps on medium-compound tyres gave Hamilton a four-millisecond advantage over Red Bull Racing driver Max Verstappen. A lock-up on his second flying lap led to Verstappen's return to the pits to change to soft tyres. At the end of the session, Verstappen improved to take first place on the timesheets, setting the time on the faster soft-compound tyres locked him into starting the race on Sunday, and Hamilton was likewise locked into using the more durable medium-compound tyres. In the third and final qualifying session, Verstappen was able to use the slipstream of his teammate Sergio Pérez to secure pole position for the race, with Hamilton only able to take the second spot on the grid.

Qualifying classification 

Notes
  – Nikita Mazepin qualified 20th, but he withdrew before the race as he tested positive for coronavirus. His place on the grid was left vacant.

Race

Race report

Start and opening laps 
The race started at 17:00 local time on Sunday 12 December. Lewis Hamilton immediately took the lead from Max Verstappen on the race start, prompting Verstappen to attempt to regain his position at the turn 6 chicane. Verstappen's trajectory forced Hamilton off the track, and the Briton re-entered slightly further ahead of the Dutch driver than he was before the corner. Arguing that he should have ceded the position to Verstappen, Red Bull Racing protested the racing line taken by Hamilton, and were told by radio that Hamilton had ultimately given back any advantage gained. The incident was referred to the stewards, which concluded that no further investigation was necessary. Hamilton then utilised the durability of his medium-compound tyres to extend his lead over Verstappen, whose soft-compound tyres were suffering from greater degradation.

Pit-stops and virtual safety car 
Verstappen made his stop at the end of lap 13 with Hamilton following suit one lap later, both opting for a set of the hardest tyres. The lead drivers pitting elevated Sergio Pérez to first, with the Mexican driver being informed his strategy was to hold up Hamilton to allow his teammate Verstappen to catch up. Hamilton caught up with Pérez on lap 20; a spirited defence from the Red Bull second driver allowed Verstappen to significantly close the gap from about 11 seconds after the pits to 1.3 second. Verstappen was unable to take advantage of it, with Hamilton's superior pace extending the gap to four seconds by the midpoint of the race.

On lap 26, Alfa Romeo's Kimi Räikkönen collided with the barriers at turn 6, prompting his retirement due to brake issues in his 349th and final Formula One race. On the same lap, George Russell retired in his final race for Williams due to gearbox issues. On lap 35, Antonio Giovinazzi retired his car alongside the track due to gearbox issues, which triggered a brief virtual safety car period. Red Bull used this opportunity to bring Verstappen in for a fresh set of the hard-compound tyres without losing track position; Mercedes, not wishing to give up track position, directed Hamilton to stay out. Using the advantage of fresher tyres, Verstappen gradually reduced the post-stop deficit from seventeen seconds to eleven, but not at a rate which would have been sufficient to catch Hamilton before the end of the race.

Final laps
On lap 53, a crash at turn 14 for Nicholas Latifi, who was fighting for position with Haas' Mick Schumacher and had dirty tyres after going off circuit at turn 9, brought out the safety car. Hamilton again stayed out without pitting because he would have lost track position had the safety car period not ended, while Verstappen pitted behind him for a fresh set of the softest available tyres. Pérez retired under the safety car due to oil pressure. After Verstappen's pit stop, he retained second, but with five lapped cars (those of Lando Norris, Fernando Alonso, Esteban Ocon, Charles Leclerc, and Sebastian Vettel) between himself and Hamilton (in first). As the debris from Latifi's crash was being cleared by the race marshals, the lapped drivers were initially informed that they would not be permitted to overtake. On lap 57 Masi gave the direction that only the five cars between Hamilton and Verstappen were to unlap themselves.

Immediately after Vettel passed the safety car to join the lead lap, race control announced the safety car would enter the pits at the end of the lap to allow for a final lap of green-flag racing, leading to angry remonstrations from Mercedes team principal Toto Wolff. On the final lap, Verstappen used his fresh soft tyres to pass Hamilton into turn 5 to take the lead of the race. He held off counter-attacks from Hamilton to win the race and his first World Drivers' Championship, with Hamilton in second and Ferrari driver Carlos Sainz Jr. in third. AlphaTauri driver Yuki Tsunoda finished in a career-best fourth place, after overtaking Bottas. Mercedes gained enough points to win their eighth consecutive Constructors' title, extending their own record. Over the radio, Wolff appealed to Masi to reinstate the order of the penultimate lap, to which Masi gave the reply: "Toto, it's called a motor race, ok? We went car racing."

Race classification 

Notes
  – Includes one point for fastest lap.
  – Sergio Pérez was classified, as he completed more than 90% of the race distance.
  – Nikita Mazepin withdrew before the race as he tested positive for coronavirus. His place on the grid was left vacant.

Safety car controversy 
Michael Masi was involved in a safety car procedure controversy during the last laps of the race. On lap 56 of the race, during which Hamilton was leading, Masi allowed only the five cars directly in between championship contenders Hamilton and Verstappen to unlap themselves before the restart. The race restarted, and on the final lap of the race, Verstappen overtook Hamilton and won the 2021 World Drivers' Championship.

Mercedes' post-race protests 
Mercedes protested the race result, alleging that Verstappen had overtaken Hamilton during the safety car and that Masi violated safety car procedure by allowing the cars directly in front of Verstappen to unlap themselves, and no others, and that according to regulations the restart should have occurred the following lap, which would have resulted in Hamilton's victory. While the first issue was dismissed because Verstappen was not ahead at the end of the safety car period, the second issue was more contentious, with Mercedes retaining legal counsel for the protest. Mercedes argued that if a message for lapped cars to overtake is issued under Article 48.12, then all lapped cars are required to unlap, and that the safety car was required to wait until the end of the following lap to return to the pit lane; if this process was complied with, Mercedes submitted that Hamilton would have won the race and therefore the championship, and requested that the classification be amended as such. Red Bull argued that a) the regulation stated "any cars", not "all cars", were required to overtake under Articles 48.12; b) 48.13, which governs the withdrawal of the safety car, overrides Article 48.12; c) Article 15.3 gives the race director overriding authority over the use of the safety car; and d) the race result would not have changed if all eight lapped cars were permitted to unlap. Masi argued that the principle behind Article 48.12 was to remove cars which "interfered" with drivers racing on the lead lap and that all teams had agreed in principle that all races should end under racing conditions.

The stewards dismissed the protest on the grounds that, according to article 48.13 and 15.3 in the Formula One sporting regulations, the race director has the "overriding authority" to amend any rule regarding safety car procedure as deemed necessary, and to declare Hamilton the winner for leading at lap 57 would retrospectively shorten the race. With the protests dismissed, Verstappen was provisionally confirmed as the world champion, pending any appeal. Mercedes lodged their intention to appeal to the FIA's International Court of Appeal citing potential breaches of Article 15 of the International Sporting Code and Article 10 of the FIA's Judicial and Disciplinary Code, with the team given 96 hours after the race had concluded to decide whether they wished to take the matter further.

Mercedes lodged their intentions to appeal the ruling. Following the FIA's announcement that it would conduct a "detailed analysis and clarification exercise" of the incident and its admission that the controversy was "tarnishing the image" of the sport, Mercedes decided not to pursue their appeal, and announced the discontinuation of their protest on 16 December, several hours before the submission deadline. Amongst the reasons to discontinue, Wolff said that neither he nor Hamilton wished to be awarded the drivers' championship in court, and instead would focus their efforts in to ensuring an equitable result from the FIA's investigation into the sporting code. Wolff remained heavily critical of Masi's direction of the race—in particular, Wolff criticised Masi's decision in Abu Dhabi as being inconsistent with a decision at the 2020 Eifel Grand Prix, where Masi cited the need to let all cars unlap to extend a safety car period—and both he and Hamilton boycotted the FIA Prize Giving Ceremony that evening. Hamilton was later fined for not attending; he asked the FIA to donate the fine as contribution towards the work the body carries out with underprivileged children. The statement also fuelled speculation that Hamilton could announce a snap retirement after being disillusioned by the race's events, although Wolff indicated both he and his driver would continue in the sport after a period of reflection in the off-season.

Race reactions and commentary 
In the immediate post-race interview, Hamilton and his father Anthony congratulated Verstappen and his family on his first World Drivers' Championship.

Several drivers criticised Masi's decision which was seen as a divergence from standard safety car procedure. In a last-lap radio message to his race engineer Peter Bonnington, that was not played on the television feed, Hamilton said the race result had been "manipulated". Russell, who was signed to be Hamilton's teammate at Mercedes in 2022, called the race finishing decision of race director Michael Masi "unacceptable". Norris, who was situated at the front of the five cars permitted to unlap, said the decision to go racing again on the last lap was made "for TV", and Alonso, Ocon, Leclerc, and Vettel, the drivers of the other four cars in the pack, also expressed confusion at the sudden instruction to unlap. Daniel Ricciardo, who was situated immediately behind Verstappen during the safety car period and was not permitted to unlap himself, said he was "speechless" at the instruction, especially as it did not allow him to also race the five-car pack on newer soft-compound tyres, and Sainz Jr., who was positioned behind Ricciardo and Lance Stroll's cars upon the restart and was under pressure from Yuki Tsunoda, Pierre Gasly, and Valtteri Bottas, opined that the decision to resume racing under the circumstances "nearly cost [him his] podium". Speaking at Aston Martin's 2022 car launch in February 2022, Lance Stroll described the Abu Dhabi situation as "ridiculous" and that rules should be set in stone before a season starts.

Masi's decisions were criticised on social media and by racing drivers as unusual and to contrive excitement.  world champion Damon Hill commented that the decision appeared without precedent, stating that it was "a new way of running the sport, where the Race Director can make these ad hoc decisions". Former world champion Nico Rosberg felt that Masi "did not follow the rules", and said that Christian Horner demanding "one more lap of racing" to Masi via radio was inappropriate, but sympathised with Masi, commenting: "He's got the whole world watching and he has to decide in the next 15 seconds what he's doing." Writing for Fox Sports, Jack Austin stated that Formula One "engineered" the finish to increase viewer excitement. Jordan Bianchi of The Athletic echoed a similar sentiment, suggesting that Masi's decision was to ensure that "Netflix gets another juicy storyline for the next season of Drive to Survive", and also questioned his capability in effectively officiating a race.

The fairness of Masi's decision in changing safety car procedure was also disputed. Swedish former racing driver, Stefan Johansson, commented: "Whether it's intentional or not, the entertainment value of this controversy has gone through the roof. But I think there has to be a balance somewhere because the decisions Masi made...completely ignored any level of common sense as to what would have been a fair way to handle the situation". India's first Formula One driver, Narain Karthikeyan, also questioned the concept of fairness: "It was a great battle for the championship but what happened yesterday it wasn't sport. You need close battles in Formula One but it has to be fair at the same time...What happened was not fair". German former rally champion, Walter Röhrl, called for races to be decided on the track or in a "fair, clear process that is not influenced by any opaque external decisions". Dutchman and former Formula One driver, Christijan Albers, also raised the issue of fairness: "Michael Masi seemed a bit unsure at a few races last year. He made some ambiguous decisions. But he certainly played a decisive role in the final leg of the season, which left many in bewilderment. Everyone wanted the season finale to be fair". Writing in The Times, Matt Dickinson agreed the officiating process should be thoroughly reviewed, he rejected complaints that the decision could have been made for entertainment on the grounds that "rules in sport are contrived — and frequently tweaked to make a sport more entertaining — and we should not pretend that there is only one perspective of justice, or that sport is an endless pursuit of fairness." Labour peer and vice-chairman of the All Party Parliamentary Group on Formula One, Peter Hain, commented that the events at the finale was not good for the sport. Hain said: "It may be exciting and it may be dramatic, it may gain the audiences that Formula One craves, but you have to think of the credibility and the integrity of the sport in the longer term...the FIA can't afford to have Formula One tarnished in this way".

BBC chief Formula One writer Andrew Benson commented that Masi had changed his mind about the procedure, going back to the 2020 Eifel Grand Prix, when both Hamilton and Verstappen complained that the safety car procedure was unnecessarily long.

Several analysts stated that Masi's decision had direct bearings on the championship results. Andrew Benson, writing for the BBC opined in March 2022, that if Masi had allowed all lapped cars to un-lap themselves, the race would not have restarted at all, and Hamilton would have won both the race and championship. David Croft stated that Hamilton would have won the race and the championship had "the rules been adhered to as they are written". Formula One driver Karun Chandhok stated that Verstappen would have won the championship, even if the normal procedure had been followed, had the lapped cars gone past before the end of lap 56. Dutch newspaper NRC Handelsblad noted the role that luck had played throughout the season, and that it was not Verstappen's fault that his win had "become tainted with controversy."

Others drew attention to the pressure placed on Masi in ending the safety car. Dutch newspaper de Volkskrant made note of the immense pressure on a Formula One race director to make snap decisions, and expressed sympathy with Masi on that basis. Scuderia Ferrari team principal Mattia Binotto defended Masi, saying that "his job was the most difficult job on the planet at that time." Four-time world champion Sebastian Vettel defended Masi and the stewards, commenting: "Everyone has an opinion, I think leave the stewards alone, it's tough enough as it is. Ideally we'd like more consistency but there's also a human side, so it's probably difficult to get it 100 per cent right, but it has to be our target, so we need to see what we can improve." McLaren team principal Andreas Seidl said that Masi's role needs to be understood in the context of an intense title battle and appreciated.

Horner defended Masi's decision making, saying Mercedes lost the race due to strategic errors rather than from the restart. Formula One driver Narain Karthikeyan stated Mercedes had made the right strategic decisions and questioned Masi's ability to handle pressure. Former Formula One driver Romain Grosjean defended Masi's decision and commented: "There's a few ways of seeing it. It would have been very strange to not unlap those cars and have Lewis first and then Max four cars behind over one lap for the world championship. And, on the other hand, for Lewis it was definitely not a great call. But as a TV fan, as a spectator, as for the sport, I think Michael Masi made the right decision."

Nicholas Latifi apologised for causing the crash, which led to the controversial safety car period. Latifi stated that he received abuse and death threats from some fans on social media. Latifi subsequently issued a statement condemning the online abuse he received. Latifi stated that he had received messages of support from Hamilton and that he had to be accompanied by additional personal security when attending events ahead of the 2022 season. He also confirmed personal plans to highlight the effect on mental health that online abuse can have on people, following his own personal research into the subject. Masi has also been subject to social media abuse and death threats as a result of the race controversy.

On 11 January 2022, the BBC reported that Hamilton was considering his future in the sport pending the outcome of FIA's upcoming report into the events of the race with the Formula One paddock expecting the FIA to take significant action as a result of the race, including the replacement of Masi as FIA race director, with Hamilton ultimately staying in the sport. According to BBC journalist Benson, Masi had "failed to apply the rules correctly in two different ways" and that Mercedes denied claims that they dropped their post race appeal after being assured that Masi would step down or be removed from his role. Formula One journalist Mark Hughes said Hamilton's silence since the race had echoes of Ayrton Senna's past feud with the governing body after the championship deciders in 1989 and 1990. Mitchell commented that the Abu Dhabi situation was just one part of wider dissatisfaction from teams with how the FIA had begun to apply regulations in the seasons following Masi's appointment in 2019. Meanwhile, on the subject of Hamilton potentially announcing a snap retirement, 1978 World Champion Mario Andretti believed the desire to try an win an eighth title would prove too hard to resist regardless of the outcome of the inquiry and that Hamilton would drive in the 2022 season and that Hamilton would be doing a "disservice" to himself if he did not race for another season. McLaren CEO Zak Brown said the sport should not just automatically assume that Hamilton is going to stay on in the sport for 2022, though Brown personally expected him to contest it. Brown also cited the Abu Dhabi controversy along with the last minute cancellation of the 2020 Australian Grand Prix and the handling of the running of the rain affected 2021 Belgian Grand Prix as signs or symptoms of the fact the FIA had shown itself to be suffering from organisational and rule-making problems for a significant period of time and urgently needed to be resolved. The 1997 World Champion Jacques Villeneuve opined that Hamilton was staying silent because he was trying to distance himself from Mercedes boss Toto Wolff and perhaps considering a career in the film industry. Hamilton subsequently broke his silence, continuing to race for the 2022 season.

FIA inquiry and regulation changes 
On 15 December 2021, the FIA announced that it would be investigating the running of the race with the goal of learning what happened and to determine if adjustments are needed for the safety car procedure. The FIA review started in January 2022.  In the same statement, the FIA stated that misunderstandings from teams, drivers, and fans had "tarnished the image" of the World Drivers' Championship. Formula One journalist Scott Mitchell criticised the FIA's initial statement in response to the controversy for its suggestion that fans had misunderstood events that occurred at the end of the Grand Prix.

Speaking on 17 December 2021, FIA president Mohamed bin Sulayem hinted he was considering making changes to avoid such controversy in future, and did not rule out the possibility of removing Masi from his role of Formula One race director.  On 13 January 2022, the FIA hinted that it was considering making changes to the safety car procedures as well as its own internal operational structure within Formula One after the FIA launched a consultation with all ten Formula One teams on "various issues", including a review of the events in Abu Dhabi.

The BBC reported that Mercedes had dropped their appeal against the results after reaching a quid pro quo agreement with the FIA, in which Masi and Formula One's technical director Nikolas Tombazis would not be in the same position for the 2022 season, in exchange for dropping their appeal. It was also reported that Wolff would have a personal meeting with Sulayem to discuss the way forward from the incident, including the future of race director Masi.  Drivers were expected to cite what they perceived to be a lenient attitude by Masi and race stewards towards Verstappen's driving during the 2021 season, with Andrew Benson of BBC Sport saying this could result in the FIA being forced to take a harder line on driving standards in future, and the FIA subsequently published these new guidelines ahead of the 2022 season which included stricter rules on wheel to wheel combat and stricter and better defined imposing of track limits. Former Formula One driver-turned commentator Martin Brundle also commented on the controversy, stating that "removing Masi won't solve F1's credibility concerns" caused by the incident, and three-time Grand Prix winner Johnny Herbert felt Masi had done "too much damage" to the sport's reputation with his action and should be replaced.

On 28 January 2022, the BBC reported that Masi would be replaced as part of a restructure to the FIA's Formula One race weekend officiating system with race officials expected to be given more flexibility through rule tweaks over matters, such as deployment of the safety car and that teams will likely be prohibited from talking to the race director on stewards decisions as part of such reforms. The Race and Sky Sports also ran similar stories on Masi being replaced. The Race's article further stated that some of the responsibilities of the race director could be reassigned to different personnel. FIA secretary General Peter Bayer stated that the race director had "too much" to cope with. Bayer also stated that Masi could stay with the organisation in another capacity, even if he was to be replaced in role of race director. On 9 February 2022 it emerged the FIA had added previously unheard radio messages between Masi and Red Bull team manager Jonathan Wheatley to their lines of inquiry. This exchange seems to suggest that Masi seemed to be taking instructions from Wheatley with the Red Bull team manager appearing to tell Masi he did not need to let all the lapped cars unlap themselves and to withdraw the safety car quickly. Following its investigation and a meeting of the F1 Commission on 14 February 2022 the FIA said it would reveal an 'action plan' for structural changes within its organisation later that same week.

On 17 February 2022, race control was restructured, with Masi removed from the position of race director and with Eduardo Freitas and Niels Wittich alternating in the role with former deputy race director Herbie Blash as a permanent advisor and a new virtual race control with the parameters of acceptable communication between teams and race director being restricted to reduce lobbying. Radio transmissions between teams and the FIA will no longer be broadcast on television coverage to ease pressure on race officials. The FIA subsequently revealed regulation changes regarding safety car procedures to be used from the 2022 season onwards. Under these changes rather than waiting until the lap after the last car has unlapped itself from the leader, the safety car will now be withdrawn one lap after the instruction that lapped cars may unlap themselves has been given. In a Sky Sports F1 documentary (released after Masi's removal as race director reviewing the title battle between Hamilton and Verstappen), Mercedes boss Toto Wolff stated he had "never spoken with Masi since the race" and "did not wish to ever speak to him again", and claimed that Masi had "bromance" with Red Bull team manager Jonathan Wheatley suggesting that Masi may have been unduly influenced by Red Bull relating to decisions over restart positions in Saudi Arabia and the Abu Dhabi final lap restart which Wolff likened to the abolished golden goal rule formerly used in association football. Furthermore, in remarks published on 11 April 2022 Wolff referred to former race director Masi as having been a "liability" to the sport and hinted that Masi did not take well to receiving feedback or criticism from anybody as well as suggesting that Masi had acted disrespectfully at times towards some drivers in driver briefings on occasions.

Following the removal of Masi as race director, Max Verstappen stated that he does not care for the opinion of fans who say his title win might have been tarnished by Masi's actions.

On 19 March 2022 the FIA published their official report into the Abu Dhabi controversy. They noted that the safety car had not completed an additional lap before leaving the track as required by regulation 48.12. The report noted that differing interpretations of Article 48.12 and/or 48.13 "likely contributed to some of the confusion surrounding the safety car unlapping procedure". It further noted that not all lapped cars had been allowed to unlap and that this had stemmed from human error, following from the process of identifying the lapped cars being a manual one, and promised the implementation of software to automate communication. The report also noted that the 2022 Formula 1 Sporting Regulations were updated to clarify that "all" and not "any" cars must be permitted to unlap themselves. The report concluded that Masi had acted in good faith and that there could be different interpretations of the rules. The findings also stated that the communication between the team principals of Mercedes and Red Bull with Masi during the final laps was inappropriate. The report further confirmed that the 2021 Formula One World Championship results remained valid. Recommendations were made to clarify the safety car regulations and to clamp down on radio communications between the teams and race control. In addition, from the 2022 Australian Grand Prix, the FIA restricted drivers from driving alongside other cars at the restart following a safety car period, a tactic Verstappen had employed at this race.

Final Championship standings 

Drivers' Championship standings

Constructors' Championship standings

 Note: Only the top five positions are included for both sets of standings.

See also 
 2021 Yas Island Formula 2 round

Notes

References

External links 

Abu Dhabi Grand Prix
Abu Dhabi Grand Prix
Abu Dhabi Grand Prix
Abu Dhabi Grand Prix
Abu Dhabi Grand Prix, 2021
Formula One controversies